The Deprisa Team is a Bolivian UCI Continental cycling team founded in 2019.

Team roster 
Roster in 2019:

Major wins 
2019 
1st Stages 7 Vuelta a la Independencia Nacional, Sebastián Caro

References

UCI Continental Teams (America)
Cycling teams established in 2019
Cycling teams based in Bolivia